The 2019 US Open described in detail, in the form of day-by-day summaries.

Day 1 (August 26) 
 Seeds out:
 Men's Singles:  Fabio Fognini [11],  Guido Pella [19],  Taylor Fritz [26]
 Women's Singles:  Angelique Kerber [14],  Caroline Garcia [27]
 Schedule of Play

Day 2 (August 27) 
 Seeds out:
 Men's Singles:  Dominic Thiem [4],  Stefanos Tsitsipas [8],  Karen Khachanov [9],  Roberto Bautista Agut [10],  Félix Auger-Aliassime [18],  Kyle Edmund [30]
 Women's Singles:  Sloane Stephens [11],  Garbiñe Muguruza [24],  Carla Suárez Navarro [28],  Barbora Strýcová [31]
 Schedule of Play

Day 3 (August 28) 
 Seeds out:
 Men's Singles:  Borna Ćorić [12]
 Schedule of Play

Day 4 (August 29) 
 Seeds out:
 Men's Singles:  Lucas Pouille [25],  Dušan Lajović [27],  Benoît Paire [29],  Cristian Garín [31],  Fernando Verdasco [32]
 Women's Singles:  Simona Halep [4],  Petra Kvitová [6],  Aryna Sabalenka [9],  Hsieh Su-wei [29]
 Men's Doubles:  Ivan Dodig /  Filip Polášek [11]
 Mixed Doubles:  Anna-Lena Grönefeld /  Oliver Marach [7]
 Schedule of Play

Day 5 (August 30) 
 Seeds out:
 Men's Singles:  Kei Nishikori [7],  Nikoloz Basilashvili [17]
 Women's Singles:  Anastasija Sevastova [12],  Sofia Kenin [20],  Maria Sakkari [30],  Dayana Yastremska [32],  Zhang Shuai [33]
 Men's Doubles:  Pierre-Hugues Herbert /  Nicolas Mahut [4],  Jean-Julien Rojer /  Horia Tecău [5]
 Women's Doubles:  Samantha Stosur /  Zhang Shuai [6],  Lucie Hradecká /  Andreja Klepač [10],  Kirsten Flipkens /  Johanna Larsson [11],  Darija Jurak /  María José Martínez Sánchez [13],  Veronika Kudermetova /  Galina Voskoboeva [15],  Raquel Atawo /  Asia Muhammad [16]
 Schedule of Play

Day 6 (August 31) 
 Seeds out:
 Men's Singles:  John Isner [14],  Nick Kyrgios [28]
 Women's Singles:  Kiki Bertens [7],  Caroline Wozniacki [19],  Anett Kontaveit [21]
 Men's Doubles:  Raven Klaasen /  Michael Venus [3],  Mate Pavić /  Bruno Soares [6],  Nikola Mektić /  Franko Škugor [9],  Henri Kontinen /  John Peers [14]
 Women's Doubles:  Anna-Lena Grönefeld /  Demi Schuurs [5]
 Schedule of Play

Day 7 (September 1) 

 Seeds out:
 Men's Singles:  Novak Djokovic [1],  David Goffin [15]
 Women's Singles:  Ashleigh Barty [2],  Karolína Plíšková [3],  Madison Keys [10],  Petra Martić [22]
 Men's Doubles:  Łukasz Kubot /  Marcelo Melo [2],  Rajeev Ram /  Joe Salisbury [10]
 Women's Doubles:  Chan Hao-ching /  Latisha Chan [7],  Nicole Melichar /  Květa Peschke [9]
 Mixed Doubles:  Nicole Melichar /  Bruno Soares [5]
 Schedule of Play

Day 8 (September 2) 

 Seeds out:
 Men's Singles:  Alexander Zverev [6],  Marin Čilić [22]
 Women's Singles:  Naomi Osaka [1],  Julia Görges [26] 
 Men's Doubles:  Bob Bryan /  Mike Bryan [7],  Robin Haase /  Wesley Koolhof [13]
 Women's Doubles:  Hsieh Su-wei /  Barbora Strýcová [2]
 Mixed Doubles:  Gabriela Dabrowski /  Mate Pavić [2],  Květa Peschke /  Wesley Koolhof [8]
 Schedule of Play

Day 9 (September 3) 

 Seeds out:
 Men's Singles:  Roger Federer [3],  Stan Wawrinka [23]
 Women's Singles:  Johanna Konta [16],  Wang Qiang [18]
 Men's Doubles:  Oliver Marach /  Jürgen Melzer [16]
 Women's Doubles:  Tímea Babos /  Kristina Mladenovic [1],  Duan Yingying /  Zheng Saisai [12]
 Mixed Doubles:  Demi Schuurs /  Henri Kontinen [6]
 Schedule of Play

Day 10 (September 4) 

 Seeds out:
 Men's Singles:  Gaël Monfils [13],  Diego Schwartzman [20]
 Women's Singles:  Donna Vekić [23],  Elise Mertens [25]
 Women's Doubles:  Gabriela Dabrowski /  Xu Yifan [3],  Lyudmyla Kichenok /  Jeļena Ostapenko [14]
 Mixed Doubles:  Samantha Stosur /  Rajeev Ram [3],  Latisha Chan /  Ivan Dodig [4] 
 Schedule of Play

Day 11 (September 5) 
 Seeds out:
 Women's Singles:  Elina Svitolina [5],  Belinda Bencic [13]
 Men's Doubles:  Kevin Krawietz /  Andreas Mies [12],  Jamie Murray /  Neal Skupski [15]
 Schedule of Play

Day 12 (September 6) 
 Seeds out:
 Men's Singles:  Matteo Berrettini [24]
 Men's Doubles:  Marcel Granollers /  Horacio Zeballos [8]
 Schedule of Play

Day 13 (September 7) 
 Seeds out:
 Women's Singles:  Serena Williams [8]
 Mixed Doubles: Chan Hao-ching /  Michael Venus [1] 
 Schedule of Play

Day 14 (September 8) 
 Seeds out:
 Men's Singles:  Daniil Medvedev [5]
 Women's Doubles:  Victoria Azarenka /  Ashleigh Barty [8]
Schedule of Play

References

Day-by-day summaries
US Open (tennis) by year – Day-by-day summaries